Resurrection Elementary School may refer to:
Resurrection Elementary School (Pittsburgh), a former elementary and middle school in Pittsburgh, Pennsylvania
 Resurrection Elementary School, a school in the district served by the Brant Haldimand Norfolk Catholic District School Board